Phoenix North America Chinese Channel is one of the six channels that Phoenix Television operates. It was launched on 1 January 2001 in order to serve Chinese viewers in North America, and it is the first Chinese language   channel that is available across the continent. This channel now broadcasts on both Dish Network and DirecTV satellite systems and shares a similar programming with Phoenix Chinese News and Entertainment Channel. Some of its in-house programmes include "Phoenix North America News"  and "Experience America" .

Related Channels
Phoenix Television
Phoenix InfoNews Channel
Phoenix Chinese News and Entertainment Channel

External links
 

Television networks in the United States
Television channels and stations established in 2001